The Church of San Dionisio (Spanish: Iglesia de San Dionisio) is a church located in Jerez de la Frontera, Andalusia, Spain. It was built in the late 15th century in Gothic-Mudéjar style, although its interior was later renovated in Baroque style (18th century) by architects Diego Antonio Díaz and Pedro de Silva. It was declared Bien de Interés Cultural in 1964.

Description
The parish was established by Alfonso X the Wise in the name of Saint Denis as the city was returned to Christian rule on Saint Denis's Day in 1264.

The church has a basilica plan, divided into three naves by tall and simple pillars adorned with Almohad decorations. The arcades (aside from those near the high altar) are ogival. The naves end with apses with Baroque altars, including the high altar which dates to the pre-Baroque renovation.

The side chapels are in Baroque style. The chapel of the Christ of the Water includes an image of Jesus from the 15th century. The tower known as Torre de la Atalaya was also built in the fifteenth century. Although this is attached to the church it was a civilian construction intended to serve as a watchtower for both fires and attack and to hold the town's clock. The tower has been separately listed from the church as being of cultural interest. The tower was first mentioned in 1447 and the clock was installed in 1454 and the tower was first used as a watchtower in 1484.

References

Gallery

See also 
 List of Bien de Interés Cultural in the Province of Cádiz

Bien de Interés Cultural landmarks in the Province of Cádiz
Churches in Jerez de la Frontera
15th-century Roman Catholic church buildings in Spain
18th-century Roman Catholic church buildings in Spain
Gothic architecture in Andalusia